A belgicism is a word, expression, or turn of phrase that is unique to Belgian French. Even though the French spoken in Belgium is closer to the French spoken in France than the French spoken by Québécois, there are a considerable number of words and phrases that have disappeared from common usage in other Francophone nations that remain common in everyday Belgian speech.

Certain words used in Belgium that are not used in Standard French are also found in northern France and in Switzerland, for example chicon ('endive') and septante ('seventy', unlike the ventigesimal soixante-dix, or 'sixty-ten', used in France.) In these cases, these words are sometimes not classified as being solely belgicisms.

Origins of Belgicisms

Belgium has three national official languages, and consequently, the French spoken in the French part of Belgium is considerably under the influence of the languages of the other Belgian regions, and is also enriched by vocabulary from the languages of neighbouring countries, mainly Dutch, but to a much lesser extent German as well. In addition, there's also influence from English on Belgian-French distinct from its influence on French-French (e.g., the word boiler is not used in Metropolitan French).
 
Belgian French is also enriched by vocabulary from other regional Romance languages, such as Picard, Walloon, Lorrain and Champenois. Belgicisms directly influenced by Walloon are specifically called Wallonisms.

Different types of belgicisms
One can point to:

 phonetic belgicisms, which are not written differently from standard French words, but are pronounced differently:
 Many Belgians pronounce <ui>  like , unlike French speakers of French. Most French individuals notice a difference between the two sounds, but many Belgians do not. Another difference in pronunciation stems from how loan words with the letter 'w' are pronounced. In these cases, however, /ɥi/ and /v/ (the latter in "wagon" but not in "wallon") are supposed to be the norm.
Thus, although for many French people, brin (stalk) and brun (brown), are homophones, for Belgians they are not.
 The distinction between long and short vowels is also upheld, which can create minimal pairs in the presence of a mute ending consonant: e.g. "bot" (as in un pied bot, a club foot) and "beau" (beautiful) are not homonyms in Belgian French, creating minimal pairs of sentences like J'ai vu son pied gauche, il était bot (~ I saw she was club-footed on the left) vs. J'ai vu son pied gauche, il était beau (~ I saw she had a beautiful left foot). (In this particular case, "bot" might be heard as [boʔ] or [bo] depending on idiolect or regiolect, vs. "beau" [boː].)
 Another unusual aspect of Belgian French is the clear difference between the pronunciation of 'ai' and 'ais' at the end of a word. As a consequence, Belgians rarely confuse the future tense and conditional when writing.
 Belgian speakers pronounce the final T in certain words that some French do not: for example, huit (eight) and vingt (twenty) are pronounced  and  respectively before a pause.
 Archaic belgicisms that come from the foreign rule over Belgium in the past. Belgium has been occupied by Dutch, English, Spanish, Austrian, French and German powers, all of which have indubitably laid a footprint on Belgian French. Also worth mentioning is the use of 'septante' and 'nonante' for 70 and 90 respectively.  Although these words are used in Switzerland and in the Democratic Republic of Congo, as well as in Jersey legal French, in the rest of the Francophone world, the ventigesimal 'soixante-dix' and 'quatre-vingt-dix' are used. Also échevin (which existed in Ancien régime French but was replaced in France by adjoint au maire) is still the official Belgian terms for the members of a township's executive power.
 Belgicisms that were manufactured by the Belgian government. Like France and Québec, Belgium too has an administration in place to prescribe language use. Belgium undertook a series of measures to combat linguistic sexism by creating feminine versions of masculine gender occupations. For example, professeur and docteur had no feminine-gender equivalent words, even though many women had these occupations. In March 1989, the Belgian administration prescribed that all jobs would have a grammatically masculine and feminine form (le docteur could be la doctoresse.) This feminization of words has no official equivalent in metropolitan France.
 Belgicisms of Germanic origin such as the word bourgmestre which comes from the Dutch burgemeester and refers to the mayor of a village or township.
 Belgicisms with different meanings to other variants of French. Some words have a different meaning in Belgium from those in other Francophone countries:
 La cassonade in Belgium is a light or dark brown sugar extracted from beets; in Québec, it is a brown cane sugar.
 What is called endive in France is called chicorée in Belgium and vice versa. (The chicon is a (Belgian) chicorée grown in the dark to keep it white rather than green.)
 outre-Quiévrain is used to refer to Belgium by the French, and to France by the Belgians; Quiévrain is the border crossing point on the old main Paris-Brussels railway line.
 Words for new concepts created separately in Belgium and in France. For instance, Belgian logopède vs. French orthophoniste, independently formed on different Greek roots to mean "a speech therapist". Similarly, Belgian un parastatal vs. French un organisme semi-public.

Some examples

See also

 Belgian French
 Flemish
 Walloon language
 Varieties of French

Dutch language
French language
Languages of Belgium
French dialects

fr:Français de Belgique#Le lexique : les belgicismes